Vivian Xu may refer to:

Vivian Hsu (born 1975), Taiwanese singer and actress
Vivian Hoo (born 1990), Malaysian badminton player